Dietzianus is a genus of true weevils in the beetle family Curculionidae. There are at least two described species in Dietzianus.

Species
These two species belong to the genus Dietzianus:
 Dietzianus liliputanus (Dietz, 1891) i
 Dietzianus pygmaeus (Dietz, 1891) i b
Data sources: i = ITIS, c = Catalogue of Life, g = GBIF, b = Bugguide.net

References

Further reading

 
 
 
 

Curculioninae
Articles created by Qbugbot